Deborah Fallows is an American writer and linguist. She is a fellow at the New America Foundation, and was assistant dean in languages and linguistics at Georgetown University.

Early life and education
Fallows grew up in both Minneapolis, Minnesota and Vermilion, Ohio.

She graduated with a B.A. from Harvard University and received a Ph.D. in theoretical linguistics from the University of Texas.

Career
Fallows was the assistant dean of languages and linguistics at Georgetown University. She chose to be a stay at home mother after the birth of her second son. Fallows wrote of her experiences in her first book, A Mother's Work (1985).

From 2012 to 2017, Fallows and her husband, James Fallows, flew their single-engine plane across America to visit small towns, which was the basis of their latest book, Our Towns (2018). The book was made into an HBO documentary film in 2021.

Fallows and her husband started the Our Towns Civic Foundation in 2021.

Personal life
With James Fallows she has two sons and five grandchildren.

Selected works

References

External links
 

21st-century American women writers
American women non-fiction writers
Harvard University alumni
Living people
People from Vermilion, Ohio
University of Texas alumni
Writers from Ohio
Year of birth missing (living people)
New America (organization)
Georgetown University faculty
Linguists from the United States
Women linguists
20th-century American women writers
20th-century linguists
21st-century linguists